Mount Vernon is a neighborhood of Baltimore, Maryland, located immediately north of the city's downtown district.  Designated a city Cultural District, it is one of the oldest neighborhoods originally home to the city's wealthiest and most fashionable families.  The name derives from Mount Vernon, the home of George Washington, given the original Washington Monument, a massive pillar commenced in 1815 to commemorate the first president of the United States, is the defining feature of the neighborhood.

Overview 
The Baltimore City Planning Commission defines the neighborhood as being bound by Eager Street to the North, The Jones Falls Expressway (JFX, aka Interstate 83) to the east, Franklin Street to the South, and Eutaw Street to the West. The commission also considers the northern section to be the Midtown-Belvedere neighborhood after the Belvidere estate of John Eager Howard, the Revolutionary War patriot.  The Inner Harbor is about half a mile south of Centre Street.

Being close to downtown, Mount Vernon is well-served by public transit.  Many area major bus routes head through the neighborhood on their way to the financial district including the Purple Line of Charm City Circulator which runs through Mt. Vernon northbound on Charles Street and southbound on St. Paul Street.  The Light Rail line runs along Howard Street on the west edge of the neighborhood, and the Metro Subway runs beneath Eutaw Street a block west of that; both have stations within easy walking distance of the neighborhood. Penn Station, served by Amtrak and MARC commuter rail, is also one block to the north past Mount Royal Avenue and over the JFX.

Although mainly residential, Mount Vernon-Belvedere is home to a mix of institutions, including the Peabody Conservatory of the Johns Hopkins University, Walters Art Museum, University of Baltimore, Maryland Historical Society, The Contemporary, Maryland Institute College of Art, Joseph Meyerhoff Symphony Hall, Baltimore School for the Arts, Lyric Opera House, Center Stage, Enoch Pratt Free Library Central Branch, Spotlighters Theatre, the Eubie Blake National Jazz Institute, and the Peabody Bookshop and Beer Stube (demolished 1997).

In the decades after World War II, the neighborhood has also become home to many professional service providers, including medical and legal offices, publishing firms, architectural firms, insurance and financial institutions, and fund managers.  Art galleries, retail stores, hotels, and bed and breakfasts (B&Bs) also populate the neighborhood, and Mount Vernon has a rich nightlife, with a variety of restaurants, cafes, and bars located along N Charles Street and throughout the neighborhood.

During the 1970s, Mount Vernon began to form into a gay village for Baltimore with the establishment of the Gay and Lesbian Community Center of Baltimore (GLCCB) in 1977, now known as the Pride Center of Maryland. LGBT milestones included the first Pride parade in 1975, and the creation of the GLCCB Health Clinic in 1980.

Architectural history 
The centerpiece of the Mount Vernon neighborhood, the cruciform arrangement of parks surrounding the Washington monument, represents one of the nation's first examples of city planning for the express purpose of highlighting a monument.  The Washington Monument was completed in 1829 to a design by Robert Mills, and in 1831 the Howard family was granted permission to lay out the surrounding parks which eventually were lined by stately homes.  The parks, which have survived almost intact, are considered to be the finest existing urban landscapes by the Beaux-Arts architectural firm of Carrere & Hastings, who also designed the New York Public Library, portions of the U.S. Capitol in Washington, D.C., and the residence that houses the Frick Collection.

Elsewhere in the neighborhood are many older apartment buildings and three and four-story row houses which were originally single-family dwellings, though many have been broken up into multiple apartments a growing number are being restored back to single family use. The historic beaux-arts Belvedere Hotel, opened in 1903, was converted to condominiums in 1991.

On the northeast corner of Washington's monument sits the Mount Vernon Place United Methodist Church.  Conceived as a cathedral of Methodism, it was built on the site of the Charles Howard mansion – the house in which Francis Scott Key died.  In 2021, the church's owners sought planning permission to subdivide the building, separating the church from the adjacent Asbury House. The southeast corner from the monument is occupied entirely by buildings comprising the Peabody Institute, and the southwest corner includes three buildings forming the Walters Art Museum.

The Stafford Hotel, built in Mount Vernon in 1894, now serves as an apartment building primarily for students at Johns Hopkins University-Peabody.

The old Mount Vernon Hotel, built in 1847, was the mansion home of U.S. Congressman William Julian Albert (1816–1879) where he entertained Abraham Lincoln. Later the house was converted into a hotel (1867) and was where Oscar Wilde stayed as part of his 1882 lecture tour of America. The building is extant at 702 Cathedral Street, in the district.

The Mount Vernon Place Historic District, a defined portion of the neighborhood, about 1.5 to 2 blocks north, south, east, and west of the Washington Monument, was listed on the National Register of Historic Places and further designated as a National Historic Landmark District on November 11, 1971, for its significance in architecture and landscape planning.

Selected parcels with the National Historic Landmark District have been designated Baltimore City Landmarks, including:
Washington Monument and Mount Vernon Place (defined as the city square of the monument and the cruciform-shaped area of parks radiating north, south, east and west)
Peabody Institute, 1-21 E. Mount Vernon Place
Thomas-Jencks-Gladding House, 1 W. Mount Vernon Place
George Howard House, 8 E. Madison Street

The National Historic Landmark District also includes:
Mount Vernon Place United Methodist Church and Asbury House, individually NRHP-listed
Stafford Hotel

The Mount Vernon neighborhood also includes:
First Unitarian Church, NRHP-listed, NHL, BCL

The entire Mount Vernon neighborhood, with eastern boundary defined as Jones Falls Expressway (Interstate 83) is included within the Baltimore National Heritage Area, which was established in 2009.

Demographics
As of the census of 2000, there were 4,520 people living in the neighborhood.  The racial makeup of Mount Vernon was 55.3% White, 33.4% African American, 0.2% Native American, 7.4% Asian, 1.2% from other races, and 2.3% from two or more races. Hispanic or Latino of any race were 3.1% of the population.

60.4% of the population were employed, 3.5% were unemployed, and 36.0% were not in the labor force, a reflection in part of the student population.  The median household income was $21,225.  About 15.2% of families and 26.9% of the population were below the poverty line.

5.6% of occupied housing units were owner-occupied. 10.2% of housing units were vacant.

Education
Public schools are operated by the Baltimore City Public School System. This includes the Baltimore School for the Arts on Cathedral Avenue.

In 2010 Baltimore Leadership School for Young Women (BLSYW), a charter secondary school for girls, moved into its permanent campus, the former headquarters of the Greater Baltimore Young Women's Christian Association (YWCA) in Mount Vernon. The BLSYW was the first newly established public school in that area in three decades.

See also 

 Culture of Baltimore
 List of National Historic Landmarks in Maryland
 National Register of Historic Places listings in Central Baltimore
 Washington Monument (Baltimore)

References

External links

Mount Vernon - Belvedere Association
Baltimore National Heritage Area
Mount Vernon Place Conservancy
Baltimore, Maryland, a National Park Service Discover Our Shared Heritage Travel Itinerary
NPS Mount Vernon Place Historic District
 at the Maryland Historical Trust; and accompanying map

 
Historic American Landscapes Survey in Maryland
Neighborhoods in Baltimore
National Historic Landmarks in Maryland
Gay villages in the United States
LGBT culture in Baltimore
Historic districts on the National Register of Historic Places in Baltimore
Beaux-Arts architecture in Maryland
Baltimore National Heritage Area
Baltimore City Landmarks